Marc Brügger is a Swiss curler and coach.

As a coach of Swiss women's national team he participated on 2010 Winter Olympics and number of World and European championships.

Teams

Record as a coach of national teams

References

External links
 
 Olympische Winterspiele 2010 Curling - Curling Club Küsnacht
 
 Erfolge des Curling Club Dübendorf
 Erfolgreiche GC Trophy 2017
 The Swiss womens curling team, skipper Luzia Ebnoether, Carmen Kueng,... News Photo - Getty Images
 

Living people
Swiss male curlers
Swiss curling champions
Swiss curling coaches
Date of birth missing (living people)
Place of birth missing (living people)
Year of birth missing (living people)